Pattoki is a city in the Kasur District of the Punjab province of Pakistan. It is the headquarters of Pattoki Tehsil, an administrative subdivision of Kasur District. Pattoki is known as the 'City of Flowers', due to the abundance of flowers found there. It is a highly neglected city on the part of administration to provide this city as a status of district because Kasur city is very very far from Pattoki.

Notable people
Famous personalities of Pattoki include Arif Nakai who was ex- chief minister Punjab. belong to its vicinity and lives in nearby village Wan Adhan. As well as One Pound Fish Man who is a singer who was born in the city. Also Rana Muhammad Iqbal Khan who was ex - Speaker of Punjab Assembly lives nearby its village in Lambey Jagir in a small village near a Phool nagar town.

Location
It is an important railway station between the Okara District and Lahore. Pattoki city has also one of the largest University of Pakistan which called University of Veterinary and Animal sciences Ravi campus.

References 

Market towns in Pakistan
Populated places in Kasur District